Sir John Worrell Carrington,  (29 May 1847 – 11 February 1913) was a British jurist, elected representative, and colonial administrator between 1872 and 1902. He served the Caribbean colonies of Barbados, St. Lucia, Tobago, Grenada, and British Guiana until his final appointment as Chief Justice of Hong Kong.

Early life

Carrington was born in 1847 at St Joseph's parish on Barbados and was the fourth son of Thomas Worrell Carrington (1801–1855), a planter, of Industry Plantation. He had a dozen siblings and an older brother, George Carrington (1841–1891) who was also a lawyer in the firm of Messrs. Carrington and Sealy, Solicitors in Bridgetown St. Michael's.

He attended The Lodge School. was then a scholar at Codrington College and was even known for having played one first-class cricket match for the island before he finished in 1866.

Carrington's mother, Christian Wharton Reed (1815–1883) was from an Oxfordshire family and his ties with Oxford were clearly strong. Like many fortunate Barbadian's often did when the island was part of the British West Indian colony, he had the opportunity to travel to and from England and to pursue his higher educated there at Lincoln College, Oxford, where he obtained a B.A. in 1868. Then, aged 22, he was called to the Bar at the Lincoln's Inn on 6 June 1872.

Four months later, before returning to Barbados to begin his career in earnest, he married on 2 October 1872 in Oxford, Susan Catherine (1847–1928) the only daughter of William Walsh of Norham. Most of the couple's children - Catherine Worrell (1874–1946), John Walsh (1879–1964), Charles Worrell (1880–1948) and Ruth Alice (1884–18970, where born at 'The Farm' and 'Norham' at Saint Michael parish on the island. His son Charles also studied at Lincoln's Inn (1900), became Captain of the Grenadier Guards and was himself awarded the D.S.O. His last son, Edward Worrell Carrington (1888–1915), born in Oxford, also became a Captain (in RAMC) and was awarded the Military Cross having been killed at the First Battle of Loos in 1915.

Carrington was awarded and Honorary D.C.L. by the University of Durham in 1879.

Legal appointments

After his return to Barbados Carrington was made a member of the House of Assembly from October 1874 to December 1878, when he was called to a seat in the legislative council, and acted a Judge Assistant at the Court of Appeal from 1874 to 1875 (a post he took again in 1879).

He was appointed Solicitor General of Barbados from 1877, acted as Attorney-General between 1881 and 1882, and then till 1889 he served as Chief Justice for several Caribbean governments. For Tobago (1883–1885) he was engaged in 1885–1886, under the sanction of the Colonial Office, in preparing and printing a draft revised edition of the Laws of Tobago, and in which capacity he was thanked by their Secretary of State and Governor-in-Charge for his services in connection with Education in that Colony. For St Lucia in 1888–1889 to create a new edition of their laws. For Grenada between August and October of 1886.

Then, shortly after being granted a C.M.G. in 1888, once again Carrington was in the position of Attorney General now for British Guiana from 1889 to 1896, during which time he collated four volumes of The Laws of British Guiana (1774-1895) and was appointed a Queen's Counsel (1890).
 
In 1896, he took the appointment of Chief Justice of Hong Kong, presiding as the chief judge of the Supreme Court.  Soon after his appointment, in 1897, he was knighted. He served as Chief Justice until 31 March 1902, when he retired on a pension. After stepping down, he prepared a revised edition of the ordinances of the colony.

He commanded the Hong Kong Volunteer Corps from 1896 to 1901 and was given a farewell parade in 1901.

Retirement

Carrington retired due to ill health in March 1902, and left Hong Kong to live first at Oxford and later at Reading, England, where he died on 11 February 1913 at the age of 65.

References

|-

|-

1847 births
1913 deaths
British Guiana judges
People educated at The Lodge School, Barbados
Alumni of Lincoln College, Oxford
Members of Lincoln's Inn
English civil servants
Colony of Barbados judges
Chief Justices of the Supreme Court of Hong Kong
British Hong Kong judges
Knights Bachelor
Companions of the Order of St Michael and St George
Fellows of the Royal Geographical Society
British Windward Islands judges
Attorneys-General of British Guiana
Governors of British Tobago
British colonial attorneys general in the Americas
19th-century King's Counsel
Knights of Grace of the Order of St John
Members of the House of Assembly of Barbados
Barbados cricketers
Chief Justices of Tobago